Alessandro Berardi (born 16 January 1991) is an Italian professional footballer who plays for Hellas Verona as a goalkeeper.

Club career
Born in Rome, Berardi joined Hellas Verona on loan deal from Lazio on 30 August 2012. On 17 July 2013, he joined Salernitana on a season long loan deal. He was loaned out again in the next year, this time to Grosseto. On 10 January 2015, it was announced that he has left the club  and joined Messina on loan to get more first team opportunities.

Berardi signed permanently with Messina in September 2015. On 22 September 2017, he signed a one year deal with Serie B club Bari.

On 14 December 2018, he returned to Hellas Verona as a free agent.

References

External links

Living people
1991 births
Association football goalkeepers
Italian footballers
Footballers from Rome
S.S. Lazio players
Hellas Verona F.C. players
U.S. Salernitana 1919 players
F.C. Grosseto S.S.D. players
A.C.R. Messina players
S.S.C. Bari players
Serie B players
Serie C players